Asrai is a band from Schiedam, Netherlands.  Their music is mostly on the border between gothic and metal genres.

History 

The band was founded by the twin sisters Karin and Margriet in the raw underground scene of Rotterdam in 1985 and changed their name in 1988 to Asrai.  Several of its members played in various punk and new-wave bands. At that time their music already had a melancholic dark side.

Asrai released several demo-tapes from 1989 to 1994 ("the Blue tape", "So clear that you couldn't tell where the water ended and the air began", "Love is a Lie", "Live in a package"). Finally in 1997 they released their debut CD, As Voices Speak. This CD was noticed and signed to the label Poison Ivy. On this label a German release of As voices speak was issued.

Asrai contracted by Transmission Records, recorded their second CD Touch in the Dark. Roman Schoensee produced this CD while Sascha Paeth mixed it.
The CD was recorded in both Holland (Excess Studio) and Germany (Beautiful Lake Studio).

On 26 May 2004, the album Touch in the Dark was released in most European countries as well as in Asia and North and South America.
The single "Pale Light" was released 6 May. The video-clip for their single was made by the duo Marcel de Jong and Jelle Swetter.
Their second single from the album Touch in the Dark ("In front of me") was released on 23 September. Again the videoclip was made by Marcel de Jong and Jelle Swetter, in addition to Maud Mulder.

In December 2006, metal and rock label Season of Mist proudly announced the signing of Asrai. Asrai's third album, Pearls in Dirt was released on 12 November 2007 (20 November in the U.S.), and the first single, "Sour Ground", was released on 5 November. A European tour followed. 

Asrai released their EP Between Dreams and Destiny on 20th August 2013 independently. It was recorded by Hans Pieters and produced by Sascha Peath, and produced the single "All seems so Hollow". Former guitarist, Jos from Grendel, remixed the song, "Stone Cold".

After 30 years Asrai released their anniversary album Hourglass, a collection of special songs, remixes etc. including "Something you Did" remixed by Hans Pieters, featuring Jacqui Taylor on guitar.

On 5th November Asrai released their digital EP Shattered Time, with the Dead can Dance tribute, "Anywhere out of the World". It was recorded and produced by Hans Pieters and Asrai.

Band members 
Margriet Mol - vocals
Manon van der Hidde - synth
Rik Jansen - guitar
Jacqui Taylor - guitar
Karin Mol - drums

Discography

Tapes 
The Blue Tape
So Clear that You Couldn't Tell Where the Water Ended and the Air Began
Love is a Lie
Live in a Package
Asrai

Studio albums 
1997: As Voices Speak
2004: Touch in the Dark
2007: Pearls in Dirt
2017: Hourglass

EP's 
2013: Between Dreams and Destiny
2020: Shattered Time

Singles & videoclips 
Pale Light
In Front of Me
Sour Ground
All seems so Hollow
Something you did
Anywhere out of the world - Dead can Dance Tribute

Collaborations 
Amanda Somerville - lyrical editor on Touch in the Dark (2004) and Pearls in Dirt (2007)

References

External links 
 Official Site
 MySpace page
 Facebook

Dutch gothic metal musical groups
Dutch gothic rock groups
Musical groups established in 1988
Schiedam